Michelle Ann Dunphy is an American politician from Maine. A Democrat from Old Town, Dunphy represents District 122 of the Maine House of Representatives, which encompasses Old Town and Penobscot Indian Island Reservation of Penobscot County. Dunphy was elected for the first time in 2014. Re-elected in 2016, 2018, and 2020, she was also chosen as Majority Leader of the House in her final term.

Dunphy is a railroad enthusiast; in 2015, Dunphy submitted a bill, An Act to Provide Passenger Rail Service to Bangor. If passed, the bill would have begun the process of returning passenger rail service to Bangor, which ended in 1960.

She is married to Matthew Dunlap, who also served as a State Representative before being elected secretary of state and state auditor. They have one daughter.

References

21st-century American politicians
21st-century American women politicians
Living people
Majority leaders of the Maine House of Representatives
People from Old Town, Maine
Women state legislators in Maine
Year of birth missing (living people)
Democratic Party members of the Maine House of Representatives